Kunszentmárton is a district in southern part of Jász-Nagykun-Szolnok County. Kunszentmárton is also the name of the town where the district seat is found. The district is located in the Northern Great Plain Statistical Region. This district is a part of Nagykunság historical and geographical region.

Geography 
Kunszentmárton District borders with Szolnok District and Mezőtúr District to the north, Szarvas District (Békés County) to the east, Szentes District and Csongrád District (Csongrád County) to the south, Cegléd District and Tiszakécske District (Bács-Kiskun County) to the west. The number of the inhabited places in Kunszentmárton District is 11.

Municipalities 
The district has 2 towns, 2 large villages and 7 villages.
(ordered by population, as of 1 January 2012)

The bolded municipalities are cities, italics municipalities are large villages.

Demographics

In 2011, it had a population of 36,147 and the population density was 63/km2.

Ethnicity
Besides the Hungarian majority, the main minorities are the Roma (approx. 1,000) and German (150).

Total population (2011 census): 36,147
Ethnic groups (2011 census): Identified themselves: 31,213 persons:
Hungarians: 29,687 (95.11%)
Gypsies: 1,137 (3.64%)
Others and indefinable: 389 (1.25%)
Approx. 5,000 persons in Kunszentmárton District did not declare their ethnic group at the 2011 census.

Religion
Religious adherence in the county according to 2011 census:

Catholic – 10,103 (Roman Catholic – 10,055; Greek Catholic – 48);
Reformed – 4,281;
Evangelical – 220; 
other religions – 349; 
Non-religious – 10,888; 
Atheism – 376;
Undeclared – 9,930.

Transport

Road network
The  expressway (W→E) goes across the district. Two exits located in Kunszentmárton District: Tiszakürt and Kunszentmárton.The road connect Békéscsaba to the highway network. 
Main road  (W→E):  Kecskemét... – Kunszentmárton District (4 municipalities: Tiszakürt, Cserkeszőlő, Kunszetmárton, Öcsöd) – ...Gyula
Main road  (N→S): Kunszentmárton District (1 municipality: Kunszentmárton) – ...Hódmezővásárhely 
Main road  (N→S):  Szolnok... – Kunszentmárton District (2 municipalities: Tiszaföldvár, Kunszentmárton)

Railway network
Line 130 (N→S): Tiszatenyő (120)... – Kunszentmárton District (2 municipalities: Tiszaföldvár, Kunszentmárton) – ...Hódmezővásárhely (135)
Line 146 (W→E): Kecskemét (140, 142, 152)... – Kunszentmárton District (4 municipalities: Tiszasas, Csépa, Szelevény, Kunszentmárton)

Gallery

See also
List of cities and towns of Hungary

References

External links
Kunszentmárton District - HunMix.hu
 Postal codes of the Kunszentmárton District

Districts in Jász-Nagykun-Szolnok County